Stag Arms is a firearms manufacturer founded in May 2003 and located in Cheyenne, Wyoming. Stag Arms is a manufacturer of the AR-15 type rifle, marketed as Stag-15 rifles. Stag advertises that all their weapons and accessories are made in the United States. They are perhaps best known for their left-handed AR-15 rifles, which use a mirror imaged upper receiver and have the ejection port reversed for left-handed shooters and the safety selector control on the right side of the lower receiver.

In February 2016, White Wolf Capital, a private equity firm, announced that it had acquired Stag Arms. According to the accompanying press release, the company will continue to manufacture firearms in New Britain, Connecticut.

In January 2017, at the 2017 Shot Show in Las Vegas, NV, Stag Arm's announced its first AR-10 type rifle, marketed as Stag-10. This rifle features the .308 caliber cartridge and will be available in the left-handed variant by July 2017. Along with this .308 left-handed platform, Stag Arm's will also be releasing a 6.5 Creedmoor in July 2017.

On June 7, 2019, Stag Arms announced relocating their headquarters from New Britain, Connecticut to Cheyenne, Wyoming, having completed their move on December 17, 2019.

Controversies
In December 2015, Stag Arm's CEO Mark Malkowski pleaded guilty to manufacturing hundreds of unserialized firearms, including dozens of rifles. The ATF required the CEO to divest all interest in Stag Arms.

References

External links
Official homepage

Manufacturing companies established in 2003
Firearm manufacturers of the United States
New Britain, Connecticut
Companies based in Hartford County, Connecticut
Military in Connecticut
American companies established in 2003